Maimo may refer to:

Maimonides School, a coeducational, Modern Orthodox, Jewish day school located in Brookline, Massachusetts
École Maïmonide, school in Montreal,Canada
Sankie Maimo (1930–2013), writer from British Southern Cameroons, later in Nigeria

See also
Moses ben Maimon (1138–1204), commonly known as Maimonides and Rambam, medieval Sephardic Jewish philosopher
Maimonides (disambiguation)